Church is the third studio album by Swedish electronic dance music duo Galantis. It was released on 7 February 2020 through Big Beat and Atlantic, and includes the singles "Bones", "I Found U", "We Can Get High", "Holy Water", "Faith", in collaboration with Dolly Parton and Mr Probz, and "Fuck Tomorrow Now".

Track listing

Notes
  signifies a co-producer
  signifies an additional producer
 "Steel", "Unless It Hurts", "Holy Water", "Stella" and "Fuck Tomorrow Now" feature vocals from Cathy Dennis.
 "Miracle" features uncredited vocals from American singer Samantha Debra.
 "We Can Get High" features vocals from Sarah Solovay.

Charts

See also
List of 2020 albums

References

2020 albums
Galantis albums
Big Beat Records (American record label) albums
Atlantic Records albums
Albums produced by Henrik Jonback
Albums produced by Svidden
Albums produced by Hook n Sling
Albums produced by Mark Ralph (record producer)
Albums produced by John Newman (singer)
Albums produced by Steve James (DJ)
Albums produced by Michael Angelakos
Albums produced by Danny Majic
Albums produced by DJ Frank E